is a museum-equivalent facility in Nemuro, Hokkaidō, Japan. It  was established by the City of Nemuro in 2004 and is classed as a general museum, collecting and exhibiting materials relating both to the humanities and the natural sciences.

History
The red-brick building in which the museum is housed dates to 1942, when it was built for a communications detail from the Imperial Japanese Navy Ōminato Guard District. Since October 2004, with its name changed to Nemuro City Museum of History and Nature, it has operated as a museum-equivalent facility, designated in accordance with the Museum Act.

Collection

The collection of some forty thousand items includes a painting of the ship Ekaterina (俄羅斯舩之図), dating from the time Adam Laxman arrived aboard the vessel on his 1792 Japanese expedition, and designated a Municipal Tangible Cultural Property; one of the four main boundary markers placed in 1906 along the 50th parallel at the time of the demarcation of the Sakhalin frontier following the Treaty of Portsmouth that brought the Russo-Japanese War to its close (the only time Japan has used boundary stones to define its territory; cf.

See also
 Nemuro Peninsula Chashi Sites
 List of Historic Sites of Japan (Hokkaidō)
 List of Natural Monuments of Japan (Hokkaidō)
 List of Cultural Properties of Japan - archaeological materials (Hokkaidō)
 Akan Mashū National Park

References

External links
  Nemuro City Museum of History and Nature
  Principal Items in the Collection (with photographs)

Nemuro, Hokkaido
Museums in Hokkaido
History museums in Japan
Natural history museums in Japan
Museums established in 2004
2004 establishments in Japan